The 2016 Colgate Raiders football team represented Colgate University in the 2016 NCAA Division I FCS football season. They were led by third-year head coach Dan Hunt and played their home games at Crown Field at Andy Kerr Stadium. They were a member of the Patriot League. They finished the season 5–5, 4–2 in Patriot League play to finish in third place.

Schedule

Source: Schedule

Game summaries

at Syracuse

at Yale

at Richmond

Cornell

at Lehigh

at Bucknell

Holy Cross

at Fordham

Lafayette

Georgetown

Ranking movements

References

Colgate
Colgate Raiders football seasons
Colgate Raiders football